College Cup may refer to:
 NCAA Division I Men's Soccer Championship
 NCAA Division I Women's Soccer Championship